John Hay, 1st Lord Hay of Yester (c. 1450 – after October 1508) is the ancestor of the Marquesses of Tweeddale. He was created a Lord of Parliament on 29 January 1488 by James III of Scotland.

He was born in Peebleshire, the son of Sir David Hay of Locherworth, Peebleshire, and later Yester in East Lothian (d. c. 1478) by his wife Elizabeth (b. c. 1400), daughter of George Douglas, 1st Earl of Angus (1370–1402) by Princess Mary (d. before 1458), daughter of Robert III, King of Scots.

John Hay married (1) Mary (d. c. 1467), daughter of John Lindsay, 1st Lord Lindsay of the Byres, and (2) by contract before 17 December 1468, Elizabeth (d. 1529), daughter of George Cunningham of Belton. There were children by both marriages:

 (1) Sir Thomas Hay, Master of Yester (d. 1491), who married Elizabeth (c. 1477–1544), daughter of Alexander Home, 2nd Lord Home, who later married James Hamilton, 1st Earl of Arran
 (1) Isabel, who married Sir Walter Ker of Cessford, & Caverton (d. c. 1601)
 (2) Sir John Hay, 2nd Lord Hay of Yester (killed at the Battle of Flodden)
 (2) George Hay of Menzion
 (2) Isabella, who married Sir Robert Lauder of The Bass, Knt
 (2) Margaret (d. c. 1525), married in 1491 to William Borthwick, 3rd Lord Borthwick (1460s – c. 1503)

References

The Scots Peerage, by Sir James Balfour Paul, Edinburgh, 1905, under 'Tweeddale'.
The New Extinct Peerage, 1884-1971, by L.G. Pine, London, 1972, p. 33.
Burke's Peerage, Baronetage and Knightage, edited by Peter Townend, 105th edition, London, 1970, p. 2697.
The Magna Charta Sureties 1215, by Frederick Lewis Weis, et al., 5th edition, Baltimore, 2002, p. 51.

1450s births
1500s deaths
John
Lords of Parliament (pre-1707)
Hay of Yester